4fm may refer to:
 4FM, an Irish radio station now known as Classic Hits
 4FM, a former Belgian radio station now known as JOE